TL Tradewinds Company Limited (commonly known as TL), formerly TL Tradewinds Ltd., Part., is a Thailand food company established in 2011 and headquartered in Surin City, Surin Province, Thailand. It manufactures lotus seeds snack products and produced food company brand is "Mai".

Distributors
Domestic
Golden Place
The Mall Group
Siam Paragon
Emporium (Bangkok)
Emquartier
Terminal 21
Platinum Mall
Tops Supermarket
Rimping Supermarket

References
 ^"My" healthy snack from the "heart" Retrieved 14 June 2015.
 ^Mighty product offensive pumped full of lotus nominee snack market Retrieved 14 June 2015.
 ^Conde Nast Traveller : MAI dried lotus seeds is one of the best 50 Gourmet Souvenirs around the world

External links

Food and drink companies of Thailand
Food and drink companies established in 2011